Brian Hainline is a medical researcher and the chief medical officer of the National Collegiate Athletic Association in the United States. Prior to taking that position in 2013, he was the chief medical officer of the United States Tennis Association.

References

External links 
NCAA Sports Science Institute profile of Hainline

Health officials
American sports physicians
Living people
Year of birth missing (living people)